Robert Stevenson "Bobby" Donnelly (born 19 January 1987) is a Scottish professional footballer currently playing as a defender for Kirkintilloch Rob Roy in the Scottish Junior Football Association, West Region. He has previously played in the Scottish Premier League for Motherwell.

Career

Donnelly began his career with Motherwell, making his debut for the club in August 2005 against local rivals Hamilton Accies in a Scottish League Cup tie. His first Scottish Premier League appearance came on the penultimate game of the 2005–06 season against Livingston. Donnelly spent a month on loan at Stranraer in early 2007 but was freed by Motherwell in April the same year.

On his release from Motherwell he joined Airdrie United in July 2007. Donnelly then joined Ayr United in the summer of 2010 but struggled with injury during his spell there.

Donnelly moved to Junior side Kirkintilloch Rob Roy in September 2011 after a trial period at Albion Rovers.

Honours
Airdrie United
Scottish Challenge Cup: 2008–09

References

External links

1987 births
Footballers from Glasgow
Living people
Scottish footballers
Association football defenders
Motherwell F.C. players
Stranraer F.C. players
Airdrieonians F.C. players
Ayr United F.C. players
Albion Rovers F.C. players
Kirkintilloch Rob Roy F.C. players
Scottish Premier League players
Scottish Football League players
Scottish Junior Football Association players